The 2004 World Outdoor Bowls Championship men's fours was held at the Northfield Bowls Complex in Ayr, Scotland, from 23 July – 7 August 2004.

Jonathan Ross, Noel Graham, Neil Booth and Jim Baker of Ireland won the gold medal.

Qualifying round
Four sections, three teams from each section qualify for championship round.

Section 1

Section 2

Section 3

Section 4

Championship round

Section 1

Section 2

Bronze medal match
England beat New Zealand 18–17.

Gold medal match
Combined Ireland beat Australia 19–18.

Results

References

Men